Justice Blair refers to John Blair Jr., associate justice of the Supreme Court of the United States. Justice Blair may also refer to:

Charles A. Blair, associate justice of the Michigan Supreme Court
David Elmore Blair, associate justice of the Supreme Court of Missouri